Luka Gregorc (born 14 February 1984) is a retired Slovenian tennis player. Gregorc reached his highest singles ranking of World No. 172 in August 2009. He lives in the United States, in the city of Boca Raton, Florida.

Career

Juniors
Gregorc's highest junior rankings were No. 9 in singles and No. 14 in doubles. He has had success at Grand Slam tournaments, including a semifinal run in doubles at the 2001 Wimbledon Championships with Jamaica's Ryan Russell.

1999–2007: Years leading to success
Gregorc entered his first professional tournament in Portorož, Slovenia, a Futures tournament, which he lost to Uros Vico of Italy, 6–1, 6–3, in the first round. He won his first match in his second tournament, another Futures tournament, this time located in Jamaica, before losing in the next round. In 2002, Gregorc reached a final in Montego Bay, Jamaica, but lost in the final to Brandon Wagner of the United States. He started to produce better results later on in the year, but in 2003 he didn't show as formidable tennis.

Gregorc has played and plays for Slovenia's Davis Cup team, playing singles and doubles in 2004, 2006, and 2007, partnering with Marko Tkalec once and Grega Žemlja multiple times. He posted a 1–2 singles record in the 2007 Davis Cup, beating his Estonian opponent Jürgen Zopp before losing two singles rubbers to Morocco's Younes El Aynaoui and Rabie Chaki. He is 4–5 in overall performances, a record that includes both singles and doubles, at the Davis  Cup.

The same happened in 2004 and 2005, however, Gregorc won his first match in his first main-level Association of Tennis Professionals ATP tournament, in Beijing, China, but lost. Finally, in 2006, he won his first tournament, winning a Futures tournament in Venezuela over Yohny Romero, playing in his native nation, in the final, before winning 1–6, 6–0, 6–3. So far, it is Gregorc's only singles title. However, he has also participated in Challenger tournaments, and has won matches in ATP tournaments in Asia, and one at the Delray Beach tournament. He has also won ATP matches since his loss in Beijing in 2005.

In doubles, Gregorc did win a Futures tournament with Roger Anderson in Montego Bay in 2002, and won another Futures title with Anderson before winning one with his current coach Marcos Ondruska.

2008 Pilot Pen
At the 2008 Pilot Pen Tennis tournament, Gregorc made a monumental run to the semifinals by beating many higher-ranked players. First, the Slovenian defeated fellow qualifier Ramón Delgado of Paraguay, before beating fourteenth seed José Acasuso 6–4, 6–4 to advance to the third round. Then, he beat Ivo Karlović, the tournament's second seed, in the third round, 7–6(4), 4–6, 6–2, before continuing his unexpected run by beating highly seeded Andreas Seppi, 4–6, 6–4, 7–5. His amazing feat was ended by Marin Čilić in the semi-finals.

2009
After qualifying for the 2009 Wimbledon Championships, he became the first male Slovenian player in history to participate in a Grand Slam tournament.

2012
Gregorc will be playing for the Philadelphia Freedoms of World Team Tennis this summer. It will be his first season playing for WTT. The Freedoms will compete in 14 matches this season, including seven home matches played at The Pavilion at Villanova University.

Singles performance timeline

Statistics correct as of August 27, 2012

External links
 
 
 

1984 births
Living people
Sportspeople from Boca Raton, Florida
Sportspeople from Ljubljana
Slovenian expatriate sportspeople in the United States
Slovenian male tennis players